Chocznia  is a village in the administrative district of Gmina Wadowice, within Wadowice County, Lesser Poland Voivodeship, in southern Poland.

The village has a population of 5,510.

The village was first mentioned in 1355, as a private village having its own 5-year old Catholic parish.

References

Villages in Wadowice County